''Haplochromis'' sp. 'Chala' is a species of fish in the family Cichlidae. It is found in Kenya and Tanzania. Its natural habitat is freshwater lakes.

References

Haplochromis
Undescribed vertebrate species
Taxonomy articles created by Polbot